All About Diva is the first live album by Serbian singer Jelena Karleuša released in November 2010 by City Records. Directed by Zoran Birtašević, the album chronicles Karleuša's 2010 Belgrade concert and includes the full version of the video broadcast. The DVD contains the entire concert and the CD includes seventeen live songs.

In 2012, the album was certified platinum by the label.

Track listing

Release history

References

2010 live albums
Serbian-language live albums
City Records albums
Jelena Karleuša albums